Mohammad Miri (Persian محمد میری ,born 4 March 1990) is an Iranian footballer who plays as a midfielder for Foolad in the Persian Gulf Pro League.

Honours 
Foolad
Hazfi Cup: 2020–21

References

External links 

1990 births
Living people
Iranian footballers
Nassaji Mazandaran players
Association football midfielders
Sepidrood Rasht players
People from Rasht
Sportspeople from Gilan province